Sex, Money, & Murder is an album by Gangsta Pat.

Track listing 
 "Intro" – 2:16
 "That Type" – 4:21
 "That Girl" – 3:46
 "Can't Mess Wit Me" – 3:56
 "Blunted Up" – 2:10
 "Homicidal Lifestyle" – 4:39
 "The Saga Continues" (featuring Villain) – 4:11
 "Let It Flow" (featuring Villain) – 4:02
 "Real G's Don't Die" – 4:27
 "Shootin' on Narcs, Pt. 2" – 3:02
 "Sex, Money, Murder" – 4:11
 "Gangsta Luv" – 4:56
 "Stupid" – 1:34
 "Pimp'n Ain't Dead" – 4:53
 "Natural High" – 4:51
 "That Type of Gangsta" [remix] – 3:48
 "Dedication" – 1:18

References

External links 
 

1994 albums
Gangsta Pat albums